SSHD (solid-state hybrid drive or solid-state hard drive) is a data storage device.

It may also refer to:
 Solid-state drive (SSD), another type of data storage device
 Society for the Study of Human Development (SSHD), a US-based research society
 Secure Shell daemon (sshd), a computer software